Smith Family may refer to:
Smith family (Latter Day Saints), American family with many members prominent in religion and politics
Smith family (bankers), English banking family founded by Thomas Smith (1631–1699)
The Smith Family (charity), Australian, independent non-profit children's charity
The Smith Family (TV series) (1971–1972), American television series, starring Henry Fonda
Smith family, fictional family of American Dad!
Smith family, fictional family of EastEnders, introduced in 1985 with Mary Smith
Smith family, fictional family of EastEnders, introduced in 2002 with Gus Smith
Smith family, fictional family of Rick and Morty

See also
List of people with surname Smith
Smiths (disambiguation)
Smith (disambiguation)
Smith (surname)
The Smiths, rock band